Pierre Haubensak (born 1935) is a painter from Meiringen, Switzerland.

References

20th-century Swiss painters
Swiss male painters
21st-century Swiss painters
21st-century Swiss male artists
1935 births
Living people
20th-century Swiss male artists